Cowbridge Road West is a major road in western Cardiff, the capital of Wales and forms part of the A48 road.

It divides the districts of Ely and Caerau and connects inner Cardiff to Culverhouse Cross and eventually the M4 motorway via the A4232.

It also connects Cardiff ultimately to towns and villages such as Barry, Wenvoe, Cowbridge and Peterston-Super-Ely which can be accessed via the A48 from Culverhouse Cross.

Ely Hospital was a large psychiatric hospital that closed in 1996 and has since been demolished. It was near to the fire station on Cowbridge Road West.

Roads in Cardiff